Thug Life, Volume I is the only studio album by American hip hop group Thug Life started by American rapper Tupac Shakur (2Pac) and also comprising Big Syke, The Rated R, Macadoshis and Mopreme Shakur, Tupac's stepbrother. It was released on October 11, 1994, through Interscope and Atlantic Records. The album features guest appearances by Y.N.V. and Nate Dogg and production by Warren G, Easy Mo Bee, Big Syke and Stretch.

The album received critical acclaim and has been regarded as one of Shakur's most underrated records.

Overview
Due to heavy criticism of gangsta rap at the time, the original version of the album was scrapped and re-recorded with many of the original songs being cut. The album only contains ten tracks because Interscope Records felt many of the other recorded songs were too controversial to release. It has been said that 2Pac created two other versions of this album, with many of the songs still remaining unreleased. Several of these unreleased recordings include a 4 verse solo version of Bury Me A G with two new 2Pac verses, a radio version of Bury Me A G with another new unreleased verse by 2Pac and two alternate recordings of Str8 Balllin', which include never before released adlibs by the rapper.

Although the original version of the album never came to fruition as the album went through a number of changes, Tupac performed the planned first single from the album, "Out on Bail" at the 1994 Source Awards. Although the album was originally released on Interscope Records, Amaru Entertainment, the label owned by Tupac's mother, Afeni Shakur, gained the rights to it. Thug Life, Volume I was certified Gold. The track "How Long Will They Mourn Me?" appeared later in 1998 from 2Pac's Greatest Hits album.

It sold 500,000 copies in the United States in 1994.

In commemoration of its twenty-fifth anniversary, it was released on vinyl on November 22, 2019. In 2019, Universal Music Group posted the video version to the song "How Long Will They Mourn Me?" to their YouTube channel. This version features an alternate verse by 2Pac with different lyrics that was not issued on the album.

Critical reception

The album has been met with critical acclaim retrospectively as a classic underground rap album.  Full of machismo and do or die stances," wrote Jake Barnes in Q, "the lyrics' hardcore posturing is perversely undercut by sweet and delicate backings from artists like Curtis Mayfield, George Clinton and The Isley Brothers."

"A shockingly considered, thoughtful rap record," opined Select's Matt Hall. "And a very chilling one."

Track listing

Charts

Weekly charts

Year-end charts

Certifications

References

1994 albums
Albums produced by Easy Mo Bee
Albums produced by Johnny "J"
Albums produced by Warren G
Tupac Shakur albums
Big Syke albums
Mopreme Shakur albums
Jive Records albums
Interscope Records albums
Atlantic Records albums
Thug Life albums